Mayville station may refer to:

 Mayville station (New York), a historic Pennsylvania Railroad train station
 Mayville station (North Dakota), a historic Great Northern Railway train station

See also 
 Maysville station, an Amtrak train station in Kentucky